Gobernador Horacio Guzmán International Airport  is an airport in Jujuy Province, Argentina serving the city of San Salvador de Jujuy. It is the northernmost Argentinian airport served by scheduled flights.

Inaugurated by Governor Darío Arias on April 19, 1967, it was originally named Aeropuerto El Cadillal. The airport was renamed in 1992 after  Dr. Horacio Guzmán, governor for most of the period between 1958 and 1964, and by whose initiative the facility was built. It is operated by Aeropuertos Argentina 2000.

Aerolíneas Argentinas used Jujuy Airport before for refuelling long flights to Bogotá, Los Angeles, Mexico City and Lima.  In 1980, the airline was operating scheduled Boeing 707 passenger flights from the airport direct to Miami once a week via a stop in Bogota.

The remodeling works inaugurated in 2019 expanded the airport's operating capacity, making it capable of operating up to four flights simultaneously: two through the sleeves and two remotely, with which it could handle more than four hundred passengers per hour. Each of its sleeves is ready to receive international flights.

Airlines and destinations

Statistics

See also

Transport in Argentina
List of airports in Argentina

References

External links
Organismo Regulador del Sistema Nacional de Aeropuertos  

Airports in Argentina